A binnacle is a waist-high case or stand on the deck of a ship, generally mounted in front of the helmsman, in which navigational instruments are placed for easy and quick reference as well as to protect the delicate instruments. Its traditional purpose was to hold the ship's magnetic compass, mounted in gimbals to keep it level while the ship pitched and rolled. A binnacle may be subdivided into sections and its contents typically include one or more compasses and an oil lamp or other light source. Other devices such as a sand timer for estimating speed may have been stored in the binnacle as well.

Binnacle can also refer to the cluster of instruments and switches mounted in a circular casing on or near the steering column of a car.

History

The construction of many early (mid-18th century) binnacles used iron nails, which were later discovered to cause magnetic deviations in compass readings. As the development of the compass and understanding of magnetism progressed, greater attention was given to binnacle construction to avoid compass disturbances caused by iron.

With the introduction of iron-clad ships the magnetic deviation observed in compasses became more severe. Methods of compensation by arranging iron or magnetic objects near the binnacle were developed. In 1854, a new type of binnacle was patented by John Gray of Liverpool which directly incorporated adjustable correcting magnets on screws or rack and pinions. These are colloquially known as "Kelvin's balls" in the UK, and "navigator's balls" in the United States. The Royal Maritime museum at Greenwich, London, has an extensive collection of binnacles. 

The ship's "binnacle list" is the medical department's report of personnel at sick bay, excused from that day's duty.

Etymology

Before 18th century bittacle, through French bitacle, from Latin habitaculum, a little dwelling.

See also
Gyrocompass
Logbook

References

Alan Gurney, Compass: A Story of Exploration and Innovation, W.W. Norton & Company, 2004, .

External links 

  

Sailing ship components
Sailboat components